Pingshan County is a county located in southern Sichuan Province, China, bordering Yunnan province to the south. It is under the administration of Yibin city. It is on the route of China National Highway 213 and Sichuan Provincial Highway 307. As of 2012, there are 131 primary schools and 22 secondary schools in the county. There are 17 hospitals and clinics in the county. The county oversees eight towns and seven townships.

Climate

References

County-level divisions of Sichuan
Counties and districts of Yibin